= Spring Street Park (Los Angeles) =

Park in Los Angeles, California, U.S.

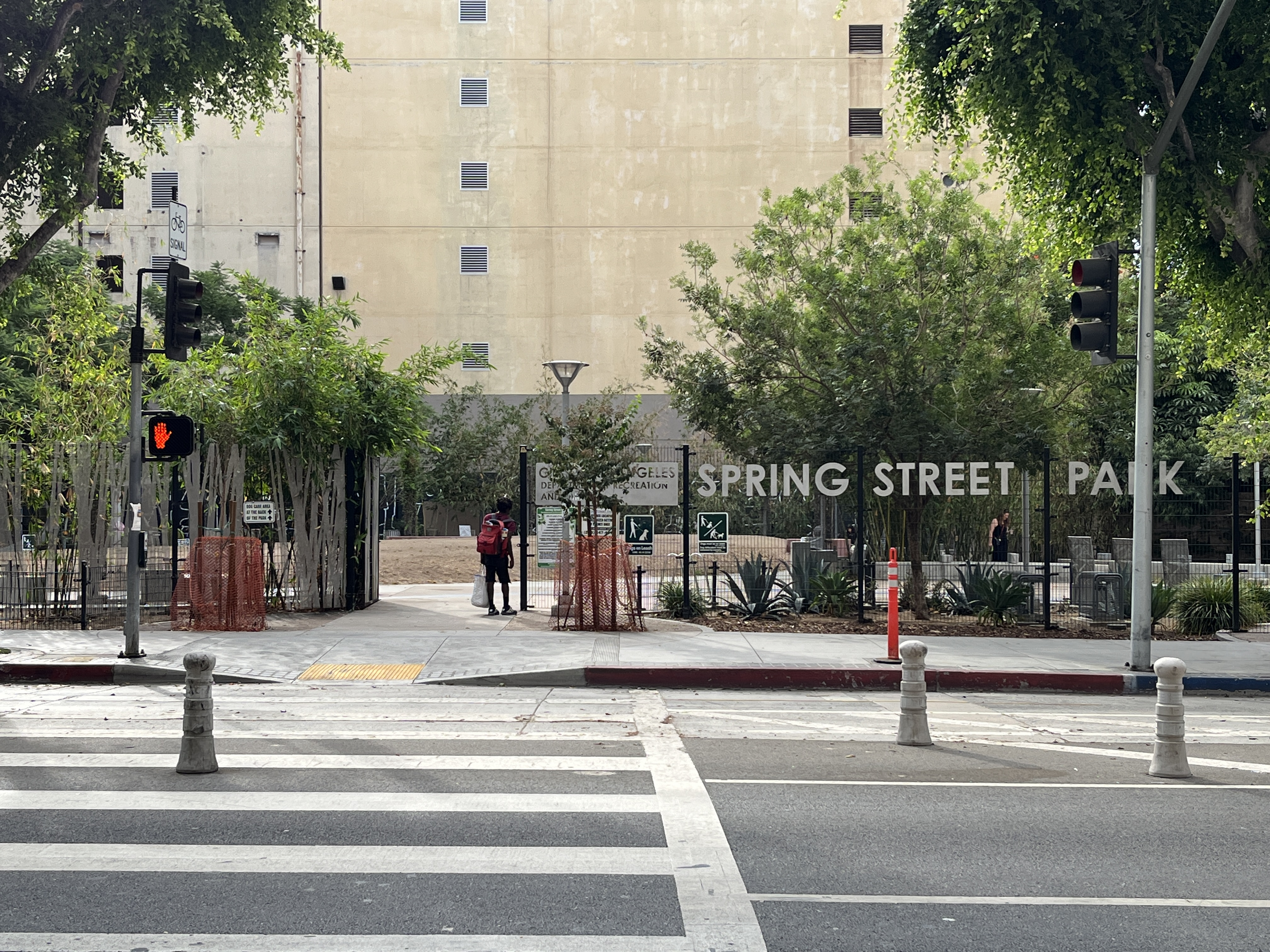
- The park in 2022
- Interactive map of Spring Street Park
- Location: Los Angeles, California, U.S.
- Coordinates: 34°2′53″N 118°14′55″W

Spring Street Park is a public park in downtown Los Angeles, in the U.S. state of California.

Work on the $8 million park project began in 2011. Trees for the park arrived in 2013. The park has an off-leash dog area, as of 2014.
